Zaanland was a steam single-screw cargo ship built in 1900 by Russell and Company of Port Glasgow for Zuid Amerika Lijn of Amsterdam with intention of carrying cattle from Argentina and Uruguay to various ports in Europe, including England. The cargo ship operated on South America to Europe route during her entire career. She was requisitioned by the US Navy in March 1918 and sunk after colliding with another vessel on her first trip under Navy flag two months later.

Design and construction
Due to increasing economic growth in South American countries of Argentina and Brazil in late nineteenth century prominent Dutch shipping, trade and banking circles felt the need to establish regular shipping connections with South America. In July 1899 they established Zuid Amerika Lijn (Z.A.L.) with total capitalization of approximately 2 million guldens. In addition, an order for three cargo ships, future SS Amstelland, SS Zaanland and SS Rijnland, was placed with Russel & Co. Zaanland was the second of these ships, and was laid down at the builder's yard in Port Glasgow (yard number 460) and launched on 7 September 1900. The ship was of the spar-deck type, had a continuous sheltered deck constructed both fore and aft to carry large quantities of cattle or light cargo. The vessel had all the modern machinery fitted for quick loading and unloading of the cargo and had electrical lights installed along the decks.

The steam for the engine was supplied by three single-ended Scotch marine boilers fitted for coal fuel.

The sea trials were held on October 12 during which the ship performed satisfactorily. Following their completion, the ship was transferred to her owners and departed for Buenos Aires.

Operational history
Upon delivery Zaanland loaded full cargo of coal and departed Greenock on 12 October 1900 bound for Buenos Aires. She reached her destination on November 10 and departed for her return trip on December 15. Zaanland eventually arrived at Dunkirk on 13 January 1901, thus successfully concluding her maiden voyage. On one of her next regular trips in July 1902 the ship struck a wharf as she was entering the port of Dunkirk and broke her stem and several plates. The freighter continued sailing on the same route through 1906, carrying cattle, meat and other agricultural products from South American ports of Buenos Aires, Montevideo, Rio de Janeiro to European ports, and coal on her way down south.

Due to epidemics of foot and mouth disease in Argentina in 1900-1903 she was precluded from carrying any meat or cattle to Europe and United Kingdom during her first two and half years of service. This ban which resulted in Z.A.L.'s reduced profitability, increasing surplus of their vessels cargo space, and negatively impacting freight rates, was not lifted until September 1903. As a result, Z.A.L.'s bottom line was significantly affected and in fact during the first five years of the company's existence it suffered a cumulative loss of nearly 700,000 guldens. Shortly afterwards, the company entered into negotiations with the government asking to provide subsidies for their service between Holland and South America. On 28 November 1907 the Senate approved such subsidy in an amount of 3 million guldens payable over a time span of fifteen years. As part of this bill, all assets owned by Z.A.L. were transferred to a newly created company, N.V. Koninklijke Hollandsche Lloyd.

At the same time a significant rise in immigration from Europe to South America brought in considerable demand for passenger service from Low Countries, France, Spain and Portugal. In September 1906 Z.A.L. inaugurated such passenger service between continental Europe and Argentina and Brazil. In order to accommodate the passengers, Zaanland and her sister ships had to be rebuilt, and as a result their gross-tonnage increased significantly. Each of the vessels was able to accommodate approximately 1,400 steerage passengers. Zaanlandsailed from Amsterdam in her new capacity as a passenger ship on 23 September 1906 and reached Buenos Aires one month later. On her return trip, when she was leaving the harbor, she hit a submerged wreck and suffered minor damage to her bottom, which only required minimal repairs.

Zaanland remained in cargo and passenger service from 1906 through 1910. With arrival in 1909 of more modern and luxurious vessels specially designed for passenger transportation, such as SS Hollandia and SS Frisia, Zaanland and her sister-ships were slowly phased out from passenger service and were retained mainly as cargo vessels serving the same routes between Brazil and Argentina and continental Europe.

After the start of World War I in 1914 and introduction of the British Blockade of Germany Zaanland continued serving the same South America to Europe route, although she had to comply with the rules of contraband and stop at British ports for inspection. In March 1916 part of her cargo, 150 casks of sausage casings, were seized in London as contraband. On 28 September 1916 it was reported that the British forced several neutral vessels including Zaanland to surrender their mails.

In the early morning, shortly before 01:00 GMT, on 1 August 1916 when Zaanland was proceeding to her anchorage spot in the Downs she struck the bow and caused damage to steamer SS Jessie which was at the time of collision at anchor. Jessie was set adrift and the current carried her towards another anchored steamship, SS Carbo I., striking and damaging her stem. Zaanland herself suffered little damage and was subsequently towed to IJmuiden.

In June 1917 Zaanland rescued 16 man crew of Norwegian barque Perfect sunk by German submarine  on June 14, and safely brought them into IJmuiden four days later.

With United States entering the war, the coal shortage situation became progressively worse throughout 1917. Most coal was either shipped to war zone or was stored in American ports for the use by the Navy. Neutral ships found it increasingly difficult to make their journeys as they had to rely on coaling in North America which was not easily available to them. Zaanland made her last commercial trip in September 1917 to South America and from there proceeded to North America for coaling and remained there for several months.

On 20 March 1918 Zaanland was seized at Newport News by the United States Government under the right of angary, which allowed a belligerent power to use the property of a neutral nation if necessary, subject to full indemnification. United States Shipping Board and its Emergency Fleet Corporation were put in charge of the freighter, which chartered the vessel to the United States Navy to be used by the Naval Overseas Transportation Service (NOTS) on 25 March 1918. Zaanland was assigned the identification number (Id. No.) 2746 and commissioned as USS Zaanland at Hampton Roads four days later.

After being repaired by the Newport News Shipbuilding and Drydock Company the freighter sailed to New Orleans for loading on 4 April and arrived there a week later. There she underwent further repairs and conversion work and embarked  of general cargo to be used by American troops in Europe. She left New Orleans on 20 April and arrived back at Hampton Roads on 25 April.

Sinking
Zaanland sailed from Norfolk bound for La Pallice on 30 April as part of Convoy HN-67. She was under command of  Lieutenant Commander Daniel Brown and had a crew of eighty one. In the evening of 12 May while in an approximate position  and travelling in foggy weather the vessel started experiencing problems with her rudder. As Zaanland went off course she was rammed by the tanker  at approximately 20:26. The collision tore a  hole in the Zaanlands starboard side causing the ship to list heavily and to start taking on water. Fifteen minutes after the collision, an order to abandon ship was given and lifeboats were launched. An entire crew of Zaanland was soon safely aboard the United States Army-chartered Munson Line cargo ship .

Munalbro stood by an entire time while Zaanland remained afloat in the hope that the vessel could be saved and towed to port. However, these hopes never materialized and Zaanland sank, bow first, at 07:10 on 13 May.

Munalbro sped up in an attempt to catch up to the convoy, but after meeting commercial vessel SS Minnesota, an entire Zaanlands crew was transferred to the west-bound vessel. Minnesota safely reached United States and disembarked the crew on May 20.

Notes

External links
Department of the Navy, Naval Historical Center: Online Library of Selected Images: S.S. Zaanland (Dutch Freighter, 1900) Served as USS Zaanland (ID # 2746) in 1918

1900 ships
Ships built on the River Clyde
Merchant ships of the Netherlands
World War I cargo ships of the United States
Cargo ships of the United States Navy
Maritime incidents in 1918
World War I shipwrecks in the Atlantic Ocean
Ships sunk in collisions